Lake Manatee is an artificial reservoir located in Manatee County, Florida. State Road 64 crosses the eastern end of the lake, while the Lake Manatee State Park is found at the southwestern end. The Manatee River flows into the lake at the eastern end, then continues to the west, where it flows into Tampa Bay. Lake Manatee State Park is located on the south shore of the lake.

History
Discussion of building a reservoir in Manatee County started in the 1950s. In 1951, the Manatee County Commission passed a resolution indicating interest in building a dam at an existing deep ravine east of the Rye Road bridge. Construction of the Lake Manatee reservoir broke ground on October 23, 1965. The dam was completed on January 9, 1967.

References

Reservoirs in Florida
Lakes of Manatee County, Florida